Pininfarina may refer to:

 Pininfarina, the Italian design house and coachbuilder
 Automobili Pininfarina, a manufacturer of high-performance sports and luxury electric vehicles
 Battista Farina (1893–1966; aka Pinin Farina, died Battista Pininfarina), founder of the company
 Sergio Pininfarina (1926–2012; born Sergio Farina), son of Battista Farina
 Andrea Pininfarina (1957–2008), son of Sergio Farina and grandson of Battista Farina
 Paolo Pininfarina (born 1958), Italian engineer, designer and businessman
 Karma Pininfarina GT, a hybrid-electric car from Karma Automotive

See also

 Farina (disambiguation)
 Pinin (disambiguation)